Uncharted Channels is a 1920 American silent drama film directed by Henry King and starring H. B. Warner, Kathryn Adams and Sam De Grasse.

Cast

References

Bibliography
 Donald W. McCaffrey & Christopher P. Jacobs. Guide to the Silent Years of American Cinema. Greenwood Publishing, 1999.

External links

1920 films
1920 drama films
Silent American drama films
Films directed by Henry King
American silent feature films
1920s English-language films
American black-and-white films
Film Booking Offices of America films
1920s American films